Niko and the Sword of Light is an American flash animated streaming television series co-produced by Amazon Studios and Titmouse, Inc. The series is based on an animated comic book of the same name and debuted on Amazon Prime Video as a pilot that premiered January 15, 2015. It was later picked up as a full series.

On August 4, 2017, it was announced that the series was renewed for a second and final season. The first half of season 2 premiered on December 27, 2018. The series concluded on September 6, 2019.

Synopsis
The series is centered around a 10-year-old human boy named Niko, who is one of the last of his kind in a strange world as he goes on an adventure to bring light back to his land.

Cast
 Felix Avitia as Niko (pilot)
 Andre Robinson as Niko (series) - Niko is the latest in a line of human Champions who have tried and failed to defeat the evil sorcerer Nar Est and destroy the Darkness, and is physically the youngest as his chrysalis was opened too soon by accident. He is an excitable young boy with a heroic spirit, a pure heart, and never shies from a challenge. Wielding the Sword of Light, Niko can defeat darkness-corrupted creatures and purify them, restoring them to their true forms. 
 Kari Wahlgren as Lyra - Lyra is the Princess of her human kingdom, Corondale, which has been imprisoned within a sphere where time has stopped, and she has literally been 14 years old for 768 years. It is her duty to mentor the Champions and guide them in the form of a spirit to defeat Nar Est, but every time the Champions have fallen. When she first meets Niko, her latest (and last) Champion, she tries to lead him somewhere safe to wait a few years for him to grow older, only for circumstances to force her to appear physically in the outside world in her mission to help Niko save them all. After Nar Est is a long last defeated, Lyra finally assumes the throne as Queen.
 Jim Cummings as the Narrator, the Darkness, the Mugwump.
 Dee Bradley Baker as Flicker - Flicker is a Buttermonk that was corrupted by Darkness and turned into a monster called Xerxes. He chased after Mandok to eat him and this resulted in freeing Niko from his chrysalis before his time. Flicker is the first darkened creature Niko purifies and returns to normal, and Flicker becomes a loyal and beloved companion of Niko and his friends. At various points of their journey, Flicker undergoes a metamorphosis via cocooning, growing bigger and larger, gaining the power to shoot lasers from his eyes, until he is fully grown, appearing like a bug/beast/dragon-like creature and becomes a means of transportation for his friends. After getting injured, Flicker again undergoes a cocooning and reverts to his original tiny form. Besides flying and his laser-vision, Flicker has the ability to project others' memories from his eyes like a movie projector. 
 Steve Blum as Nar Est, Rasper - Nar Est is an evil human sorcerer who overthrew his king and unleashed a terrible Darkness upon the world to conquer it. He was prevented however from total domination by the Shard of Light from the Crystal he corrupted, which is the source of his power. He uses his evil magic to corrupt creatures and places, turning them into horrible monsters and places fraught with danger. His crow-like bird sidekick, Rasper, constantly pecks at the sphere that contains the shrunken kingdom of Corandale. It is revealed that Nar Est himself is a (unknowing) pawn of the Darkness itself.
 Corey Burton as Jackal - Jackal is a mysterious Howlen, a humanoid canine, the group meets and befriends after a harrowing monster attack, although they don't know his name and he speaks a language only Mandok can understand. At first, he seemed a friendly, dependable ally, but revealed his true allegiances after leading them into the Thorns of Tribulation as an agent for Nar Est and that he can speak their language perfectly before he tries to steal Niko's Sword of Light.
 Tom Kenny as Mandok - Mandok is a little rodent-like Munkchip who is cowardly, bumbling, but ultimately loyal and occasionally wise. He is the one who accidentally caused Niko to awaken too soon, and winds up traveling with him and Lyra in their adventure to defeat the Darkness. His knowledge of the world comes in handy due to being up to date on certain locations.
 Kevin Michael Richardson as Beady Brothers.
 Hynden Walch as Wispy - A wisp of the Darkness that survived and escaped being destroyed by the Sword of Light. It helped Nar Est escape his imprisonment, telling him to find the Amulet of Power to help the Darkness return and conquer the world yet again.

Episodes

Pilot (2015)

Chapter 1: The Cursed Volcano (2017)

Chapter 2: The Amulet of Power (2018–19)

Awards and nominations

References

External links
 
 

Amazon Prime Video original programming
Animated television series by Amazon Studios
2010s American animated television series
2017 American television series debuts
2019 American television series endings
American children's animated action television series
American children's animated adventure television series
American flash animated television series
Television series by Amazon Studios
English-language television shows
Amazon Prime Video children's programming
Animated television series about children